Dotnacht is a village and former municipality in the canton of Thurgau, Switzerland.

It was first recorded in the year 824 as Tottinheiche.

The municipality also contained the village Engelswilen, Aufhäusern, Altshof and others. It had 327 inhabitants in 1850, which decreased to 281 in 1900. After an increase to 303 in 1950 it declined again, to 244 in 1990.

In 1996 the municipality was merged with the other, neighboring municipalities Alterswilen, Altishausen, Ellighausen, Hugelshofen, Lippoldswilen, Neuwilen and Siegershausen to form a new and larger municipality Kemmental.

References

 Former municipalities of Thurgau
 Villages in Thurgau